Harry Spencer Waddington ( – 26 February 1864) was a British Conservative Party politician.

He was elected to the House of Commons as one of the two Members of Parliament (MPs) for the Western division of Suffolk at a by-election in 1838 following the death of the sitting MP Robert Hart Logan. Waddington held the seat until he stood down at the 1859 general election. His initial election was unopposed, and no further elections in West Suffolk were contested until 1859.

References

External links 
 

Year of birth uncertain
1780 deaths
Conservative Party (UK) MPs for English constituencies
UK MPs 1837–1841
UK MPs 1841–1847
UK MPs 1847–1852
UK MPs 1852–1857
UK MPs 1857–1859